Holospiridae is a family of gastropods belonging to the superfamily Urocoptoidea of the  order Stylommatophora. 

Genera:
 Bostrichocentrum Strebel & Pfeffer, 1879
 Coelostemma Dall, 1895
 Haplocion Pilsbry, 1902
 Hendersoniella Dall, 1905
 Holospira von Martens, 1860
 Metastoma Strebel & Pfeffer, 1879
Genera brought into synonymy
 Acera Albers, 1850: synonym of Holospira E. von Martens, 1860
 Distomospira Dall, 1895: synonym of Holospira E. von Martens, 1860
 Eudistemma Dall, 1895: synonym of Holospira E. von Martens, 1860
 Haplostemma Dall, 1895: synonym of Holospira E. von Martens, 1860
 Hendersonia Dall, 1905: synonym of Hendersoniella Dall, 1905
 Liostemma Bartsch, 1906: synonym of Haplocion Pilsbry, 1902
 Malinchea Bartsch, 1945: synonym of Holospira E. von Martens, 1860
 Megaxis Pilsbry, 1946: synonym of Coelostemma Dall, 1895
 Millerella Gilbertson & Naranjo-Garcia, 1998: synonym of Holospira (Millerspira) Gilbertson & Narnajo-Garcia, 2004 represented as Holospira E. von Martens, 1860
 Tristemma Bartsch, 1906: synonym of Holospira E. von Martens, 1860 (junior homonym of Tristemma Brandt, 1835)

References

 Bank, R. A. (2017). Classification of the Recent terrestrial Gastropoda of the World. Last update: July 16th, 2017

Stylommatophora